Sir Richard Sutton, 4th Baronet (21 October 1821 – 3 October 1878) was an English first-class cricketer and British Army officer.

The son of Sir Richard Sutton, 2nd Baronet and his wife, Mary Elizabeth Burton, he was born in October 1821 at Sudbrooke, Lincolnshire.

He purchased a commission in the British Army in May 1839 as an ensign in the 97th Regiment of Foot. He later purchased the rank of lieutenant in the 1st Regiment of Life Guards in July 1847.

Sutton played first-class cricket for the Marylebone Cricket Club in 1850–51, making three appearances against Cambridge University and a single appearance against Oxford University. He made a fifth appearance in first-class cricket in 1857, appearing for the Gentlemen of Kent and Sussex against the Gentlemen of England.

He married firstly Anna Houson (died 8 July 1846), daughter of Reverend H. Houson, of Brant Broughton, in 1845. He married secondly Harriet Anne Burton in 1851.

He later served as a deputy lieutenant for Nottinghamshire and succeeded his brother, Sir John Sutton, as the 4th Baronet upon his death in June 1873. Sutton died at Ryde on the Isle of Wight in October 1878, at which point he was succeeded as the 5th Baronet by his son, Sir Richard Sutton.

References

External links

1821 births
1878 deaths
People from West Lindsey District
Queen's Own Royal West Kent Regiment soldiers
British Life Guards officers
English cricketers
Marylebone Cricket Club cricketers
Gentlemen of Kent and Sussex cricketers
Deputy Lieutenants of Nottinghamshire
Baronets in the Baronetage of Great Britain
Military personnel from Lincolnshire